Eclanamine (U-48,753) is a drug which was patented as an antidepressant, but was never marketed. It acts by inhibiting the reuptake of serotonin and norepinephrine.

See also 
 U-50,488
Bromadoline

References 

Carboxamides
Dimethylamino compounds
Antidepressants
Serotonin–norepinephrine reuptake inhibitors
Cyclopentanes